Edmund Krzymuski (1851 – 1928) was a Polish scholar of criminal law.

After studies in Kraków, Warsaw, Heidelberg, Berlin and Leipzig, he taught criminal and criminal procedure law at the Jagiellonian University of Cracow since 1884, and briefly served as its rector. Krzymuski was a member of the Codification Commission of the Second Polish Republic and contributed significantly to the codification of Polish criminal and criminal procedure law.

References

Polish jurists
1851 births
1928 deaths
Academic staff of Jagiellonian University
Rectors of the Jagiellonian University